George Albert Grosart (April 11, 1880 – April 18, 1902) was an American left fielder in Major League Baseball who played for the Boston Beaneaters in 1901.

External links 

 SABR biography

1880 births
1902 deaths
Major League Baseball left fielders
Boston Beaneaters players
Dayton Old Soldiers players
Baseball players from Pennsylvania
People from Meadville, Pennsylvania